Reported Missing! is a 1937 American thriller film directed by Milton Carruth and written by Jerome Chodorov and Joseph Fields. The film stars William Gargan, Jean Rogers, Dick Purcell, Hobart Cavanaugh, Michael Fitzmaurice, Joe Sawyer, Billy Wayne, and Robert Spencer. The film was released on August 15, 1937, by Universal Pictures.

Plot
The story follows a gang that sabotages airplanes, making them crash and then robbing the victims.

Cast

References

External links
 

1937 films
American thriller films
1930s thriller films
Universal Pictures films
American black-and-white films
Films directed by Milton Carruth
1930s English-language films
1930s American films